Liberal Democratic Union can refer to the following political parties:

 Liberal Democratic Union (Albania)
 Liberal Democratic Union (Greece)
 Liberal Democratic Union (Italy)